Tortyra hoguella is a moth of the family Choreutidae. It is known from Costa Rica, including Cocos Island from which it was described.

The length of the forewings is 5.2-6.5 mm. It has one of the most unusual wing patterns in the genus Tortyra due to the prominent white forewing fascia.

References

Tortyra
Moths described in 1981